Oak Lake is a natural lake in South Dakota, in the United States.

Oak Lake was named for a nearby grove of oak trees.

See also
List of lakes in South Dakota

References

Lakes of South Dakota
Lakes of Brookings County, South Dakota